{{Album ratings
| MC        = 75/100
| rev1      = AllMusic
| rev1score = 
| rev2      = Exclaim!
| rev2score = 7/10
| rev3      = Dork
| rev3score = 
| rev4      = 'Loud and Quiet| rev4score = 8/10
| rev5      = Pitchfork| rev5score = 6.8/10
| rev6      = PopMatters| rev6score = 7/10
| noprose   = yes
}}Quit the Curse is the debut studio album by American musician Anna Burch. It was released on February 2, 2018 under Polyvinyl Record Co.

Critical receptionQuit the Curse was met with "generally favorable" reviews from critics. At Metacritic, which assigns a weighted average rating out of 100 to reviews from mainstream publications, this release received an average score of 75, based on 10 reviews Aggregator Album of the Year gave the release a 73 out of 100 based on a critical consensus of 12 reviews.

Erin Bashford from Dork'' said of the album: "the record plays with folk and country alongside its indie rock roots. Anna has polished her brand of soft, saccharine, harmonic indie rock, and with that, presents these nine songs as a modern tale of cities and people. [The album] is a cogently written record, characterised by its barbed lyrics and dreamy instrumental." Susan Darlington from Loud and Quiet said: "Smart without giving the impression of trying too hard, Burch’s debut is full of subtle ear-worms and a lyrical intimacy that makes her the girl you want to hang out with at college."

Accolades

Track listing

Personnel

Musicians
 Anna Burch – lead vocals, guitar
 Paul Cherry – bass, guitar
 Ryan Clancy – drums
 Adam Pressley – bass
 Matt Rickle – drums
 Steve Kentala – drums
 Matthew Milia – pedal steel
 Ben Collins – guitar

Production
 Collin Dupuis – engineer, mixer
 Adam Gill – engineer
 Andy Milad – engineer
 Noah Elliott Morrison – photographer
 Heba Kadry – mastering

References

2018 debut albums
Polyvinyl Record Co. albums